Manhattan Skyline is a Norwegian mathcore band based in Oslo, Norway.  They are influenced by metal, hardcore, contemporary music, jazz, fusion and electronica.

After their performance at the 2005 Bodø Hardcore festival, The Faceless Masses website praised them as "one of the fastest and most technical bands in Norway today." After releasing an EP, they began recording a full-length debut album which was intended for an early 2007 release, but due to illness within the band, this release was postponed until 2008.

History

Manhattan Skyline was formed in Oslo in 2002 by drummer Steffen Sæther-Larsen, guitarist Fredrik Melby and vocalist Hans Marius Midtgarden. Subsequently, members of Kaospilot, Slingshot Idol, The Break Quintet, and Next Life joined and left.

In October 2003, they recorded their debut EP, Tarantula Arms, a 3" MCD of seven songs featuring off-time rhythm patterns.

Upon the departure of bassist Anders Braut Simonsen and guitarist Christian Johansen, the band used several part-time bassists while searching for a permanent member. A long search resulted in the selection of Sigurd Mæle.

Jørgen Waag began playing bass with the band and then played guitar for approximately a year before leaving. Following his departure, Even Bekkedal, formerly with In Dialogue With Radiometer, joined the band.

Manhattan Skyline contributed a song called "A) Spitting Milk or B) Swallow or Drown" to React With Protest's Emo Armageddon 7" compilation, which was released in February 2005 and included bands such as Funeral Diner, The Birds Are Spies They Report to the Trees, Suis La Lune, and Catena Collapse. Throughout 2005 and the beginning of 2006, the band was also writing and arranging new songs for their first full-length album.

Members

 Current members 

 Hans Marius Midtgarden - vocals
 Fredrik Melby - guitar
 Even Bekkedal - guitar
 Sigurd Mæle - bass
 Steffen Sæther-Larsen - drums
 Former members

 Anders Braut Simonsen - bass
 Jørgen Waag - guitar, bass
 Christian Johansen - guitar
 Hai Nguyen - bass

Discography

References

External links
 Manhattan Skylines
 Official Manhattan Skyline MySpace
 Audio Is a War website
 React With Protest website
 nov 05.html A rock historian's review of the gig at Bodø Hardcorefestival 2005 (Norwegian)
 The Faceless Masses' review of the gig at Bodø Hardcorefestival 2005 (Norwegian)

Musical groups established in 2002
2002 establishments in Norway
Norwegian hardcore punk groups
Norwegian mathcore musical groups
Musical groups from Oslo

es:Manhattan Skyline